Philip Morgan (birth unknown) is a Welsh former professional rugby league footballer who played in the 1960s and 1970s.

Background
Phil Morgan was born in Newport, Wales.

International honours
Phil Morgan won caps for Wales while at Hunslet in 1969 against France, England, and France, and in 1970 against France, and England, 1969...1970 4-caps + 1 (interchange/substitute).

References

Hunslet F.C. (1883) players
Living people
Rugby league five-eighths
Wales national rugby league team players
Welsh rugby league players
Year of birth missing (living people)
Rugby league players from Newport, Wales